The 2021–22 Blackpool F.C. season was the club's 113th season in the English Football League, and their first season back in the EFL Championship, the second tier of English professional football, after winning the EFL League One play-offs. The season covered the period from 1 July 2021 to 30 June 2022. It was head coach Neil Critchley's second full season in charge.

Blackpool began the season by picking up two points from a possible 15 during August, with draws at Bristol City and Bournemouth, and defeats at home to Cardiff City and Coventry City and at Millwall. They reached the second round of the EFL Cup, after beating Middlesbrough in the first round, but exited at the hands of Sunderland. They finished August in 22nd place in the Championship table.

By contrast, Blackpool lost only once in September. In the league, they claimed ten points out of a possible 15, with victories at home to Fulham and Barnsley, and at Middlesbrough. A 3–0 home defeat to Huddersfield Town and a 1–1 draw at Hull City were the other two results. September was closed out with the club in 14th place in the table.

In October, the club's uptick in form continued as they won four of their five Championship fixtures, beating Blackburn Rovers (home), Reading (away), local rivals Preston North End and newly relegated Sheffield United (away). They lost at Nottingham Forest in the second fixture of the run. They finished October in sixth place in the table.

November returned three points from a possible fifteen, after three draws (at home to Q.P.R. and West Brom, and at Swansea City) were bookended by defeats at home to Stoke City and at Birmingham City. They finished November in 11th place in the table. Neil Critchley also signed a new, four-year contract with the club this month.

From the fifteen points available during December, Blackpool picked up three, from a 3–1 home victory over Peterborough United. Defeats occurred at home to Luton Town, at Derby County and Huddersfield, and at home to Middlesbrough. They finished the year in 13th place, albeit having played several games more than the teams around them.

In contrast to the end of 2021, Blackpool began the first month of 2022 unbeaten (in the league, at least), after consecutive single-goal home victories against Hull City and Millwall, followed up with a draw at league leaders Fulham. They exited the FA Cup at the third-round stage (the round in which they entered) on 8 January, at the hands of Hartlepool United.

February returned eight points from a possible eighteen, with wins at home to Bristol City and Reading, draws at Coventry City and Cardiff City and defeats at home to Bournemouth and at QPR.

Blackpool began March with two successive single-goal victories, at Stoke City and at home to Swansea City. A goalless draw, at Sheffield United, followed. Due to an international break, only nine points were available in March, of which Blackpool picked up seven.

April proved to be slim pickings for points, with only eight obtained from a possible 24. Victories came at home to Birmingham City and at Barnsley; draws were gained at Blackburn Rovers and Luton Town; while the four defeats came at home to Nottingham Forest, at Preston and West Bromwich Albion, and at home to Derby County.

Since Blackpool had eight fixtures in April, they had only one in the final month of the season. They lost 5–0 at already relegated Peterborough United, a result for which Neil Critchley and captain Chris Maxwell apologised to the travelling fans. They finished the season in 16th place in the Championship.

Pre-season
Blackpool announced they would have friendly matches against Squires Gate, Southport, Newport County, Rangers, Carlisle United, Burnley, Bamber Bridge and Morecambe as part of the club's pre-season preparations.

Accrington Stanley replaced Newport County in a change that was made on 16 July. The same day, the planned friendly against Bamber Bridge was cancelled.

Irish defender Richard Keogh joined the club on 17 July following his release by Huddersfield Town.

The Rangers friendly was cancelled on 19 July after a COVID-19 outbreak amongst the Blackpool squad.

Former Scotland international Stuart McCall joined the club as assistant head coach to Neil Critchley on 22 July 2021, replacing the departed Colin Calderwood. McCall's father, Andy, played for the club in the 1940s and 1950s, and his sister was born in the town.

Striker Tyreece John-Jules joined on a season-long loan from Arsenal on 29 July.

A behind-closed-doors friendly was arranged against Manchester City on 3 August.

Results
Blackpool's visit to nearby Squires Gate on 9 July ended in a 7–0 victory for the Tangerines, the goals coming from seven different players: Harrison, Mariette, Matshazi, Francis, Bange, Yelegon and Nyame.

Another local derby, at Southport, the following day saw Blackpool win 2–0. The goals came from Demetri Mitchell and new signing Shayne Lavery. The visitors, who named different starting line-ups for each half, played most of the second with ten men, after CJ Hamilton went off with an injury.

A visit to Accrington Stanley on 17 July ended in a 3–1 defeat. Demetri Mitchell scored the visitors' goal, from the penalty spot. The same day, veteran defender Richard Keogh joined the club on a free transfer.

Blackpool travelled north to face Carlisle United on 24 July. Demetri Mitchell scored his third goal in the four fixtures in what was the only goal of the game.

On 27 July, Burnley visited Bloomfield Road, and they returned east with a single-goal victory.

On 29 July, 20-year-old forward Tyreece John-Jules joined on loan from Arsenal for the season.

Pre-season continued with a 1–1 draw at Morecambe on 31 July (the visitors' goal coming from CJ Hamilton) and concluded with a 4–1 defeat at Premier League champions Manchester City on 3 August. Luke Garbutt scored Blackpool's goal from the penalty spot.

In detail

Season proper

August
Blackpool opened their league campaign with a 1–1 draw at Nigel Pearson's Bristol City on 7 August. Chris Martin put the hosts ahead just before the interval, and the score remained that way until the fourth minute of injury time, when second-half substitute Shayne Lavery scored on his debut. Blackpool were eighth place at the final whistle, but dropped to thirteenth after the remaining fixtures were played.

Middlesbrough visited Bloomfield Road in the first round of the EFL Cup on 11 August. Blackpool won 3–0, with goals from Callum Connolly, Shayne Lavery and Keshi Anderson.

On 13 August, Ewan Bange was loaned out to Bamber Bridge.

Mick McCarthy's Cardiff City were next up at the seaside, and they returned to Wales with all three points after a 2–0 victory.

A second-successive Championship defeat followed on 17 August, 1–0 at home at the hands of Coventry City. Blackpool did climb, to 22nd, after other results that evening.

Blackpool made the long trip to Bournemouth on 21 August, and found themselves two goals down inside twenty minutes after a double from Dominic Solanke. Goals from James Husband and Jerry Yates (penalty) levelled matters, giving the visitors their second point from a possible twelve since the start of the league campaign.

Three days later, Blackpool exited the EFL Cup at the second-round stage after losing 3–2 at home to Sunderland, whose Aiden O'Brien rounded out his hat-trick with a 92nd-minute winner.

A third League defeat in Blackpool's opening five fixtures occurred at Millwall on 28 August. The visitors' Callum Connolly was sent off on 14 minutes, but Blackpool took the lead, with Shayne Lavery's fourth goal of the season, eleven minutes into the second half. Jed Wallace levelled for the Lions on 63 minutes from a free-kick. Jake Cooper scored the winner in the final minute.

On transfer-deadline day, 31 August, Blackpool brought in four players: Jordan Gabriel (returning after being on loan at the club the previous season) in a permanent, four-year deal, while Ryan Wintle (Cardiff City), Dujon Sterling (Chelsea) and Owen Dale (Crewe Alexandra) joined on loan.

September
On 9 September, Blackpool named their 25-man squad. Due to injuries to Matty Virtue, Grant Ward and Gary Madine, three spaces were left open.

The squad:

Goalkeepers: Daniel Grimshaw, Chris Maxwell, Stuart Moore. Defenders: Callum Connolly, Marvin Ekpiteta, Jordan Gabriel, Luke Garbutt, Daniel Gretarsson, James Husband, Reece James, Richard Keogh, Dujon Sterling (loan). Midfielders: Keshi Anderson, Josh Bowler, Owen Dale (loan), Kenny Dougall, Demetri Mitchell, Kevin Stewart, Ryan Wintle (loan). Forwards: Tyreece John-Jules (loan), Shayne Lavery, Jerry Yates. Gary Madine, injured since last season, was registered just before the Huddersfield fixture on 14 September. He was named on the bench for that match.

The under-21s:

Goalkeepers: Charlie Monks. Defenders: Oliver Casey, Ryan Grant, Cameron Hill, Sky Sinclair. Midfielders: Cameron Antwi, Rob Apter, Sonny Carey, Luke Mariette, Matthew Liptrott. Forwards: Ewan Bange, Brad Holmes, Johnny Johnston.

Also on 9 September, youth defender Charlie Penman joined Brighton and Hove Albion for an undisclosed fee.

Division leaders Fulham visited Bloomfield Road on 11 September. Josh Bowler's second-half strike gave Blackpool their first League win of the season, while also handing the visitors their first League defeat. The hosts climbed three places to 19th.

A 3–0 home defeat followed to Huddersfield Town on 14 September.

Blackpool's second league victory of the campaign was achieved at Middlesbrough on 18 September. Marcus Tavernier put Boro ahead inside ten minutes, but a goal from Marvin Ekpiteta and own goal by former Blackpool loanee Grant Hall gave Blackpool the three points.

A second consecutive victory followed at home to Barnsley on 25 September. Shayne Lavery's 32nd-minute strike was the only goal of the game. Blackpool climbed to 14th place.

A trip to Hull City resulted in a 1–1 draw, after Blackpool led for over half the game and despite the hosts being reduced to ten men with twenty minutes remaining. Shayne Lavery scored for Blackpool.

October
Blackpool opened October with a 2–1 home victory over East Lancashire neighbours Blackburn Rovers, their first victory over Tony Mowbray's side in nine years. Shayne Lavery scored his seventh goal in all domestic competitions the opening strike on four minutes. He pulled his hamstring shortly afterwards, and his substitute Jerry Yates double the hosts' lead twenty minutes later. Ben Brereton halved Rovers' deficit five minutes into the second half, but Blackpool held on for their fourth victory in their last six League fixtures. They climbed to 12th place.

On 7 October 2021, Australian international Kenny Dougall signed a new two-year contract with the club.

An unbeaten run of four games came to an end at the City Ground on 16 October as Nottingham Forest won their third Championship fixture in a row. Blackpool dropped three places to 15th.

Three points were picked up at Reading's Madejski Stadium on 20 October, despite being two goals down at half time. Second-half strikes from debutant Owen Dale and a double from Jerry Yates turned the scoreline around. The visitors climbed three places to 12th.

A second-consecutive victory followed three days later in a West Lancashire derby clash with Preston North End at Bloomfield Road, the first such fixture since February 2010 and Blackpool's first victory over their rivals in 24 years. Goals from Keshi Anderson and Gary Madine (his first goal in nine months) gave Blackpool the three points, as they climbed to 11th in the table. There were ten bookings and one dismissal. The visitors' Alan Browne saw red deep in injury time for his part in a post-tackle scuffle.

Blackpool finished October with a third-straight victory, defeating Sheffield United at Bramall Lane by a single goal. Keshi Anderson found the net for the second-consecutive match as the visitors climbed five places to sixth with the three points.

November
The fourth month of the season began with a single-goal home defeat to Stoke City. Blackpool dropped four places to tenth.

Blackpool held onto tenth place after a 1–1 draw with QPR at Bloomfield Road on 6 November. Gary Madine scored his second goal of the season (and the 100th of his career), from the penalty spot, after the visitors had gone ahead.

On 9 November, Ewan Bange joined AFC Telford on loan.

After an international break, another draw followed at Swansea City on 20 November. Keshi Anderson levelled for the visitors in the second half with his fourth goal of the season. Blackpool remained in tenth position.

A third-successive draw, this time goalless, followed on 23 November against West Bromwich Albion. Blackpool climbed one place to ninth with the result, but dropped to 11th after the following evening's games.

On 25 November, assistant head coach Stuart McCall left Blackpool to become assistant manager to Paul Heckingbottom at Sheffield United.

The final game of the month was a single-goal defeat at Birmingham City on 27 November. Blackpool dropped to 11th place with the result.

December
Blackpool dropped four places to 15th after a 3–0 home defeat to Luton Town on 4 December.

A third-straight defeat, at Wayne Rooney's bottom side Derby County, followed on 10 December. Their fourth defeat in their last seven games, Blackpool dropped two places to 17th.

A 3–1 victory over Peterborough United on 18 December lifted the Seasiders five places to 12th, although several matches were postponed after a COVID-19 outbreak across the country.

Two consecutives defeats followed — at Huddersfield Town on 27 December and, two days later, at home to Middlesbrough.

January
2022 was rung in with a single-goal victory over Hull City at Bloomfield Road, Gary Madine's penalty just after the half-hour mark proving decisive. Blackpool climbed to 12th place with the three points, although they had now played four more games than the teams immediately below them and three more than the two teams above them.

On 3 January, Ryan Wintle returned to Cardiff City after being recalled. Meanwhile, fellow midfielder Rob Apter was loaned out to Chester, initially until 31 January, but this was later extended until the end of the season. Four days later, another midfielder, Matthew Liptrott, joined Stalybridge Celtic, while right-back Jack Moore joined Radcliffe, both on loan.

Blackpool exited the FA Cup at the first hurdle, after losing 2–1 at Hartlepool United on 8 January in a third-round tie.

Jake Beesley joined the club, for an undisclosed fee, from Rochdale on 10 January. The following day, midfielder Tayt Trusty joined Radcliffe on loan, linking up with his Blackpool teammate Jack Moore.

On 13 January, Owen Dale, having briefly returned to Crewe at the end of his four-month loan spell, made his move to Blackpool permanent.

On 17 January, Tyreece John-Jules had his loan from Arsenal ended, having not featured for several months, while Ethan Robson was recalled from his season-long loan at MK Dons. The following day, Teddy Howe was released by mutual consent.

Ewan Bange was loaned out, for the third time, on 21 January, this time to F.C. United of Manchester.

Returning to league duty on 22 January, Blackpool beat Millwall by a single Shayne Lavery goal to make it three victories in their last five league games. Blackpool remained 12th.

On 24 January, Jordan Thorniley was recalled from his loan at Oxford United. He filled the spot in Blackpool's 25-man squad that was made by Demetri Mitchell's departure to Hibernian later the same day.

Two days later, Oliver Sarkic became the second player this month to have his contract mutually terminated. He was one of four of-age players not registered in the club's 25-man squad. The other three being Joe Nuttall, Bez Lubala and the long-term-injured Grant Ward.

Winger Charlie Kirk joined, initially on loan until the end of the season, from Charlton Athletic on 27 January.

On 29 January, Blackpool picked up a point at table-toppers Fulham. They ended the month in 14th place.

Transfer-deadline day saw three outgoings: Joe Nuttall departed for Scunthorpe United for an undisclosed fee; Sky Sinclair headed out on loan for the second time, this time to Nantwich Town until March; and Bez Lubala went on loan to Northampton Town until the end of the season. There was one arrival: centre-back Douglas Tharme from Southport. He was immediately loaned back to the Sandgrounders until the end of the season.

February
Blackpool made it ten points out of a possible twelve over their last four matches with a 3–1 home victory over Bristol City on 5 February. CJ Hamilton opened the scoring, followed two minutes later by a header from Gary Madine. Josh Bowler, subject of a £3-million bid on transfer-deadline day, made it three just after the restart. Bristol City pulled one back five minutes from time. The match had eight bookings, evenly split between the two clubs. Blackpool climbed to 13th.

A 1–1 draw at Coventry City on 8 February made it five games unbeaten. Gary Madine put the visitors ahead, his second goal in as many games. Blackpool dropped one place to 14th.

The following day, 45-year-old Iain Brunskill was installed as assistant head coach to Neil Critchley. Brunskill had formerly been Liverpool's Assistant Academy Technical Director for a decade.

On 12 February, Blackpool hosted second-placed Bournemouth. After taking the lead through Josh Bowler, with his third goal in four matches, the visitors scored two late goals to take the three points. It was Blackpool's first league defeat of 2022.

A visit to Cardiff on 19 February resulted in a point from a 1–1 draw.

A midweek visit to the capital to face QPR saw the Tangerines returning home with a defeat, after conceding a goal to Luke Amos in the final minute of normal time.

On 26 February, Paul Ince and Tom Ince returned to Bloomfield Road with Reading. After going behind, the Seasiders came back to win 4–1, with goals from Marvin Ekpiteta, Gary Madine, Shayne Lavery and Josh Bowler.

March
Josh Bowler scored the only goal of the game, and his sixth in his last eight games, as Blackpool beat Stoke City at the Bet365 Stadium. They climbed to 14th with the three points.

On 12 March, Blackpool attained three consecutive league victories for the second time in the campaign with a single-goal scoreline at home Swansea City. Gary Madine scored after four minutes, lifting the Tangerines two places to 12th.

Four days later, Sheffield United travelled over the Pennines for Blackpool's final game before a two-week break. In what was Neil Critchley's 100th match as Blackpool manager, the spoils were shared in a goalless draw.

April
After a two-and-a-half-week break, Blackpool hosted Nottingham Forest on 2 April. The visitors won 4–1, with Callum Connolly scoring the Tangerines consolation in the closing stages. Blackpool dropped one place to 14th.

On 5 April, Blackpool travelled to Preston North End. They lost by a single goal, and dropped two places to 16th.

Four days later, they were involved in another Lancashire derby, this time at Blackburn Rovers. The match finished 1–1, with Blackpool's goal, an equaliser, coming from the boot of Marvin Ekpiteta. It was his fourth goal of the season. Blackpool remained 16th.

A third defeat in four matches, this time at West Bromwich Albion, was followed by a 6–1 victory over Birmingham City at Bloomfield Road on 18 April. Jake Beesley, on his first start at home, scored twice, with the other four goals coming from CJ Hamilton, Kenny Dougall (his first since the play-off final of the previous season), a penalty from Jerry Yates and a 35-yard free-kick from Callum Connolly.

Gary Madine signed a one-year extension to his contract on 16 April, with an option for a further twelve months.

On 23 April, Blackpool drew 1–1 at Luton Town, Gary Madine scoring from the penalty spot for the visitors.

Blackpool travelled to Barnsley on 26 April. Goals from Owen Dale and Oliver Casey gave Blackpool the three points. They climbed one place to 15th, above arch-rivals Preston North End, with the three points. Matty Virtue made his first start for the club in over a year, having been out injured.

Four days later, Blackpool rounded off their home campaign with a 2–0 defeat to Derby County. Gary Madine missed a penalty that would have put the hosts ahead.

May
On 7 May, Blackpool travelled to Peterborough United for their final fixture of the campaign. Posh, already relegated to League One, won 5-0. After the match, both Neil Critchley and captain Chris Maxwell apologised to the travelling fans for what was described as their "worst display" of the season. Blackpool finished 16th in the Championship.

Three days later, the club announced its retained list for the following season. Released were goalkeeper Charlie Monks, defenders Ryan Grant and Sky Sinclair (son of former Seasider Trevor Sinclair), midfielders Cameron Antwi, Matthew Liptrott, Ethan Robson and Grant Ward, and forward Johnny Johnston. Contract options were exercised on goalkeeper Stuart Moore, defenders Richard Keogh and Jordan Thorniley, midfielders Keshi Anderson and Josh Bowler, and forwards Ewan Bange and Brad Holmes. Loanees Charlie Kirk (Charlton Athletic) and Dujon Sterling (Chelsea) returned to their respective clubs.

Competitions

Championship

League table

Results summary

Results by matchday

In detail 
The Seasiders fixtures were announced on 24 June 2021.

FA Cup

Blackpool were drawn away to Hartlepool United in the third round.

EFL Cup

Blackpool were drawn at home against Middlesbrough in the first round and Sunderland in the second round.

Lancashire Senior Cup 

Blackpool were drawn against Fleetwood Town in the first round.

Squad statistics

Players used: 28
Goals scored: 28 (including 1 own-goal)

Statistics accurate as of 18 December 2021

Transfers

Transfers in 

 Brackets around club names indicate the player joined the club after his contract expired.

Transfers out 

 Brackets around club names indicate the player joined that club after his Blackpool contract expired.

Loans in

Loans out

References 

Blackpool
Blackpool F.C. seasons